Our Lady's Hospice & Care Services is a hospice and health care provider with two locations: one at Harold's Cross, Dublin and a satellite facility at Blackrock, County Dublin in Ireland. It provides specialist care for people with a range of needs from rehabilitation to end of life care.

History
When the motherhouse of the Religious Sisters of Charity moved from "Our Lady's Mount" in Harold's Cross to Mount St. Anne's in Milltown in 1879, the sisters opened Our Lady's Hospice at Harold's Cross, pioneering the modern hospice movement. The congregation was founded by Mary Aikenhead in 1815. By 1880, Our Lady's Hospice had a capacity of forty beds, and was overseen, expanded and improved by the first sister superior of the Hospice, Anna Gaynor. Later, Catherine Cummins, or Mother Polycarp, over saw further expansion of the accommodation.

Around the time the hospice was founded n 1879, the incidence of TB, typhoid, and measles in Dublin was very high. By 1889 it was claimed that Dublin's death rate was topped only by Calcutta. Dublin's high mortality rates at the time were attributable in part to very sick rural people moving to Dublin in search of care, and thus contributing to Dublin's mortality rate. Research by Thomas Wrigley Grimsham in the early 1880s showed that the instance of TB in Ireland was rising compared to the rest of the UK where it was falling. He was able to show that from the 1860s to the 1880s there was a steady increase in the number of deaths of TB and it was also more prevalent in urban areas.

References

Further reading
 Katherine Butler / Sisters of Charity (1980) We help them home: the story of Our Lady's Hospice, Harold's Cross, Dublin, 1879–1979
 T. M. Healy (2004) 125 years of caring in Dublin: Our Lady's Hospice, Harolds Cross 1879-2004
 Multitext Project in Irish History, University College Cork

External links

 "Our Lady's Hospice help patients come to terms with dying", Irish Examiner, February 21, 2017

Hospices
Organisations based in Dublin (city)
Harolds Cross
Medical and health organisations based in the Republic of Ireland